The mountains classification in the Vuelta a España is a secondary classification in the Vuelta a España. For this classification, points are given to the cyclists who cross the mountain peaks first. The classification was established in 1935, when it was won by Italian Edoardo Molinar, and until 2005 the leader in the mountain classification wore a green jersey. In 2006, it became an orange jersey, and in 2010 it became white with blue dots.

Spaniard José Luis Laguía has won this classification a record five times, including three consecutive. Other cyclists who have won this ranking for three consecutive times were Antonio Karmany, Julio Jiménez, José María Jiménez, all Spaniards. Overall, the Spaniards have dominated this classification by 47 out of 68 times.

In 2010, David Moncoutié considered retirement, but remained a professional cyclist to try to win his third consecutive mountains classification. In 2011, he became the first rider ever to win this award in four consecutive years.

Jersey
As of 2010, the leader of the mountains classification is awarded a white jersey with blue dots.
The mountains jersey is third in the rankings of jerseys, behind the jersey for the general classification and points classification in the Vuelta a España but before the combination classification; this means that if a cyclists leads both the general classification and the mountains classification, he wears the jersey for the general classification, and the mountains jersey is passed on to the second cyclist in that ranking.

Rules
The organisation of the Vuelta designates which climbs are given points, and in which category they fall. As of 2010, there are 5 categories: most points are scored on the Top Alberto Fernández, the highest point of the Vuelta.

If two or more cyclists have the same number of points, the cyclist who was first on the 'Top Alberto Fernandez' gets the higher ranking. If that does not solve the problem, the cyclists with the most high climb finishes wins gets the higher ranking. If that does not solve it, the cyclists with the most first category wins, and so on. If after the third category there is still a tie, the order in the general classification is used.

List of winners

References

Mountains Classification
Cycling jerseys
Spanish sports trophies and awards